Rocky Votolato (born March 8, 1977 in Dallas, Texas, United States), is an American singer-songwriter.

Biography
He was raised in Frost, Texas, roughly 50 miles south of Dallas, until the age of 13.  After his parents were divorced, his mother remarried and moved the family to the Pacific Northwest in 1991, where he attended Inglemoor High School in Kenmore, Washington.  Alienated by his southern roots, the isolation led him to focus all of his attention on learning to play guitar and writing songs.  Inspired by seeing many punk shows including bands like Jawbreaker and Fugazi, he started several different musical projects while in high school.

When his former band Lying on Loot disbanded in 1996, Votolato, along with friends Rudy Gajadhar (drums) and Andrew Hartley (bass), started playing under the name Waxwing. His younger brother Cody (The Blood Brothers) soon joined the band on second guitar, and the band recorded their debut 7" for Henry's Finest Recordings. In 1999, Second Nature Recordings released their first full-length, entitled For Madmen Only. Blending straight-up rock with elements of post-hardcore, and Cody's metal reminiscent guitaring, Waxwing soon established a strong local following. The band then signed with Second Nature Recordings out of Kansas City, MO. The band then released three full-length albums: For Madmen Only in 1999, One for the Ride in 2000, and Nobody Can Take What Everybody Owns in 2002. By this time, the band's profile in the Seattle music scene had grown substantially, causing them to consistently sell out at local clubs like the Crocodile Cafe and The Paradox Theater.

In 1999, Votolato branched out from his work with Waxwing, having written a handful of songs which did not really fit in with their more aggressive, fast-tempo style. Along the way he has toured with the likes of Damien Jurado, Small Brown Bike, The Get Up Kids, The New Amsterdams, Owen and The Casket Lottery, members of the latter having provided assistance as backing musicians on occasion. His studio albums have also been littered with appearances from some of Seattle's finest musicians (including players in the bands Red Stars Theory, Sharks Keep Moving, The Blood Brothers, Death Cab for Cutie, and Pedro the Lion, and Sub Pop solo artist Rosie Thomas).

On the production side, Votolato has worked with Matt Bayles (Pearl Jam, Botch, Murder City Devils, Hayden) and Chris Walla (of Death Cab for Cutie). It is a creative input which has helped see Votolato progress stylistically with every release, from his low-key self-titled album released in 1999 - all pretty much recorded live - right through to his recent, alt-country, folk-esque offering, Makers.  A video was shot for the first track of Makers, "White Daisy Passing" - a song which also appeared on an episode of the popular TV show The OC. That same song is featured during the closing credits of the 2007 independent film Cthulhu (2007 film).

Votolato also starred in the film The Edge of Quarrel, which he worked on with Dave Larson from Excursion Records. It also includes members of the Murder City Devils and Botch, and is about a gang war between straightedgers and punk rockers and his attempts to achieve peace between the two opposing groups.

He has been married to his wife, April Votolato, for over 10 years, and they live in Seattle. Their child Kienan died at age 22 in a car accident in December 2021.

Discography

Solo
Rocky Votolato (1999) (Status Recordings)
 Rocky V/Seth Warren 7"  (1999) (Redwood Records)
 A Brief History (2000) (Your Best Guess)
 Rocky V/Suffering & The Thieves 7" (2002) (Velvet Blue Music)
Burning My Travels Clean (LP) (2002) (Second Nature Recordings)
 The Light and the Sound  (EP) (2003) (Second Nature Recordings)
Suicide Medicine (2003) (Second Nature Recordings)
Makers (2006) (Second Nature Recordings) (Barsuk)
End Like This (EP) (2007) (Second Nature Recordings)
The Brag and Cuss (2007) (Barsuk)
True Devotion (2010) (Barsuk)
 Television of Saints  (2012) (Undertow Music Collective)
 Hospital Handshakes  (2015) (No Sleep Records)
 Live at Black Belt  (2017) (Rocket Heart Records)
 Wild Roots  (2022) (Spartan Records)

Waxwing
Waxwing 7" (1999) (Henry's Finest Recordings)
For Madmen Only (1999) (Second Nature Recordings)
One for the Ride (2000) (Second Nature Recordings)
Intervention:Collection+Remix (2001) (Second Nature Recordings)
Nobody Can Take What Everybody Owns (2002) (Second Nature Recordings)

Lying On Loot
Split 7" with State Route 522 (1996) (Henry's Finest Recordings)

References

External links
Official website

American rock songwriters
American rock guitarists
American folk guitarists
American male guitarists
Musicians from Seattle
Singers from Washington (state)
1977 births
Living people
People from Navarro County, Texas
American indie rock musicians
Songwriters from Texas
Songwriters from Washington (state)
Barsuk Records artists
Guitarists from Washington (state)
Guitarists from Texas
21st-century American singers
21st-century American guitarists
21st-century American male singers
No Sleep Records artists
American male songwriters
Defiance Records artists